The 2017 Canadian Tire National Skating Championships was held January 16–22, 2017 in Ottawa, Ontario. It was organized by Skate Canada and sponsored by Canadian Tire. The event determined the national champions of Canada. Medals were awarded in the disciplines of men's singles, women's singles, pair skating, and ice dancing on the senior, junior, and novice levels. Although the official International Skating Union terminology for female skaters in the singles category is ladies, Skate Canada uses women officially. The results of this competition were among the selection criteria for the 2017 World Championships, the 2017 Four Continents Championships, and the 2017 World Junior Championships.

Medal summary

Senior

Junior

Novice

Senior results

Men

Women

Pairs

Ice dance

Junior results

Men

Women

Pairs

Ice dance

Novice results

Men

Women

Pairs

Ice dance

International team selections

World Championships
The team for the 2017 World Championships was announced on January 22, 2017.

Four Continents Championships
The team for the 2017 Four Continents Championships was announced on January 22, 2017.

World Junior Championships
The team for the 2017 World Junior Championships was announced on January 22, 2017.

References

External links

Canadian Figure Skating Championships
Figure skating
Canadian Figure Skating Championships
Sports competitions in Ottawa
Canadian Figure Skating Championships
January 2017 sports events in Canada
2010s in Ottawa